The wildlife of Rwanda comprising its flora and fauna, in prehistoric times, consisted of montane forest in one third the territory of present-day Rwanda. However, natural vegetation is now mostly restricted to the three National Parks and four small forest reserves, with terraced agriculture dominating the rest of the country.

Geography
Rwanda is a landlocked country in Central Africa, bordered by Burundi, Democratic Republic of the Congo, Tanzania, and Uganda. Rwanda's geography is dominated by savanna grassland with approximately 46 percent considered arable land and 9.5 percent dedicated to permanent crops. Grassy uplands and hills are predominant characteristics of the terrain, while the country's relief is described as mountainous, its altitude demonstrating a decline from the west towards the east.

A unique feature in the geography and geology of Rwanda is Africa's Great Rift Valley. As part of this rift, Albertine Rift
passes through the Nyungwe forest. It is a mountainous feature that "as a whole, harbors more endemic birds, mammals, and amphibians than any other region in Africa".

A rift valley is defined as: "A rift is where sections of the earth are slowly spreading apart over millions of years, creating mountains, lakes, valleys and volcanoes." Another feature is the Congo-Nile Divide. This mountain range passes through Rwanda in a north to south direction.

Nyabarongo River is a major river in Rwanda, part of the upper headwaters of the Nile and accounts for nearly 66% of the water resources of the country fed by a catchment which receives an annual average rainfall of more than 2000 mm.

The country has a temperate climate with rainy seasons twice per year, February to April and again November to January. Temperatures in the mountains are mild, though there is the possibility of frost and snow.

Protected areas

There are only three protected areas established as national parks. The Akagera National Park covers an area of 108,500 ha, Nyungwe National Park has an area of 101,900 ha and Volcanoes National Park has an area of 16,000 ha. In addition the forest reserves are the Gishwati Forest Reserve (700 ha), Mukura Forest Reserve (1600 ha), Busaga Forest Reserve (150 ha) and  Buhanga forest and gallery forest in the eastern province of about 160 ha.

Nyungwe is  the largest remaining tract of forest which contains 200 species of tree as well as orchids and begonias. Vegetation in the Volcanoes National Park is mostly bamboo and moorland, with small areas of forest. By contrast, Akagera has a savanna ecosystem in which acacia dominates the flora. There are several rare or endangered plant species in Akagera, including Markhamia lutea and Eulophia guineensis.

Flora

The forest cover in Rwanda  as of 2007  accounted for 240,746.53 ha comprising humid natural forests in 33.15% area, degraded natural forests covering 15.79%, bamboo forest of 1.82%, savannas accounting for 1.55%, large eucalyptus plantations to the extent of 26.4%,  recent plantations of eucalyptus and coppices and 5.01 percent of pinus plantations. Montane forest, one of the most ancient forests dated to even before the Ice Age which has a unique richness of 200 species of trees, many flowering plants including the giant lobelia and many colourful orchids. There are more than 140 species of orchids in the wildlife area of Nyungwe forest.

There are four defined forest categories. These are: the Congo Nile Ridge Forest, a natural forest that encompasses the national parks and reserves; the savanna and gallery-forests; forest plantations consisting of species of Eucalyptus sp, Pinus sp, and Grevillea robusta; and agroforestry areas in farm lands and also anti-erosion measures.

The world's smallest water lily, Nymphaea thermarum, was endemic not only to Rwanda, but to the damp mud formed by the overflow of a freshwater hot spring in Mashyuza. It became extinct in the wild about 2008 when local farmers began using the spring for agriculture. The farmers cut off the flow of the spring, which dried up the tiny area—just a few square meters—that was the lily's entire habitat. Carlos Magdalena, at the Royal Botanic Gardens in Kew, managed to germinate some of the last 20 seeds; eight began to flourish and mature within weeks and in November 2009, the waterlilies flowered for the first time.

Fauna

The greatest diversity of large mammals is found in the three National Parks, which are designated conservation areas.  Akagera contains typical savanna animals such as giraffes and elephants, while Volcanoes is home to an estimated one third of the worldwide mountain gorilla population.

Nyungwe Forest boasts thirteen primate species including chimpanzees and Ruwenzori colobus arboreal monkeys; the Ruwenzori colobus move in groups of up to 400 individuals, the largest troop size of any primate in Africa.
Twenty species of mammals reported by Animal Diversity web of the Museum of Geology University of Michigan are as under.

 Dendrohyrax arboreus  (eastern tree hyrax)
 Delanymyinae (Delany's swamp mice)
 Cercopithecus lhoesti (L'hoest's monkey)
 Cercopithecus hamlyni (owl-faced monkey)
 Colobus angolensis (Angolan colobus)
 Scutisorex somereni (armored shrew)
 Gorilla beringei (eastern gorilla)
 Profelis aurata  (African golden cat)
 Gorilla gorilla (western gorilla)
 Galago moholi (South African galago)
 Aonyx capensis  (African clawless otter)
 Equus burchellii  (Burchell's zebra)
 Hippopotamus amphibius  (hippopotamus)
 Aepyceros melampus (impala)
 Colobus guereza (guereza)
 Epomops franqueti (Franquet's epauletted bat)

Primates are the dominant species of fauna in the Nyungwe Forest. The species reported are Ruwenzori colobus, L’Hoest's monkeys and chimpanzees (largest concentration of 13 species). An amphibian species reported is Hyperolius viridiflavus.

Birds

There were 670 bird species in Rwanda, with variation between the east and the west. However, as per the Birdlist Organization the number of species as per WICE criteria are reported to be 711. Nyungwe Forest, in the west, has 280 recorded species, of which 26 are endemic to the Albertine Rift; endemic species include the Rwenzori turaco and handsome spurfowl.

Eastern Rwanda, by contrast, features savanna birds such as the black-headed gonolek and those associated with swamps and lakes, including storks and cranes. Further, according to the Avi Base Organization, the globally endangered species are 9 and species introduced are 3 out of a total of 692 species as of 2012.
Balaeniceps rex  (shoebill) and Agapornis fischeri  (Fischer's lovebird) are also reported.

Nyungwe forest is a designated Important Bird Area (IBA) listed by the BirdLife International. The great blue turaco is a very prominent bird species found in large numbers . It is blue, red and green, described as a "bird which streams from tree to tree like a procession of streamlined psychedelic turkeys". The European bee-eater Merops apiaster is a migrant bird species in this forest area during the winter season.
 The Rugezi Marsh shelters Rwanda's largest breeding population of grey crowned cranes. The strange weaver and the collared sunbird have been featured on Rwandan stamps.

The list of globally endangered bird species, as reported by the Avibase data of BirdLife International, are the following.

 Endangered
 Ardeola idae (Madagascar pond-heron)
 Necrosyrtes monachus (hooded vulture)
 Gyps africanus (white-backed vulture)
 Gyps rueppellii (Rueppell's griffon)
 Balearica regulorum (gray crowned-crane)
 Bradypterus graueri (Grauer's swamp-warbler)

Near-threatened

 Ficedula semitorquata (semicollared flycatcher)
 Malaconotus lagdeni (Lagden's bushshrike)
 Laniarius mufumbiri (papyrus gonolek)
 Agapornis fischeri (Fischer's lovebird)
 Falco concolor (sooty falcon)
 Falco vespertinus (red-footed falcon)
 Indicator pumilio (dwarf honeyguide)
 Lybius rubrifacies (red-faced barbet)
 Coracias garrulus (European roller)
 Rynchops flavirostris (African skimmer)
 Glareola nordmanni (black-winged pratincole)
 Gallinago media (great snipe)
 Limosa limosa (black-tailed godwit)
 Numenius arquata (Eurasian curlew)
 Neotis denhami (Stanley bustard)
 Circus macrourus (pallid harrier)
 Polemaetus bellicosus (martial eagle)
 Stephanoaetus coronatus (crowned hawk-eagle)
 Terathopius ecaudatus (bateleur)
 Oxyura maccoa (Maccoa duck)
 Phoenicopterus minor (lesser flamingo)

 Vulnerable

 Balaeniceps rex (shoebill)
 Sagittarius serpentarius (secretary-bird)
 Trigonoceps occipitalis (white-headed vulture)
 Circaetus beaudouini (Beaudouin's snake-eagle)
 Glaucidium albertinum (Albertine owlet)
 Bucorvus leadbeateri (southern ground-hornbill)
 Hirundo atrocaerulea (blue swallow)
 Calamonastides gracilirostris (papyrus yellow-warbler)
 Cryptospiza shelleyi (Shelley's crimson-wing)

Conservation
The national parks and forest reserves are under threat due to poaching, invasive plants such as water hyacinth, unauthorized livestock grazing, illegal fishing, bush fires, mining, bamboo harvesting, encroachment of protected land for agricultural farming, firewood gathering, be keeping and herbal plant extraction. This situation is attributed to governance issues lacking in legal acts and guidelines and also heavy anthropogenic pressure.

Conservation management plans have been instituted for all protected areas which involves the community of villages living in and around the protected areas. Conservation activities have focused on increasing the forest density by planting trees in a "natural self rehabilitation and natural regeneration of primary and high value species". The planting has involved species such as carissa macrocarpa, entandrophragma (a genus of eleven species of deciduous trees) and symphonia globulifera, and erecting protective fencing on the boundary of the forest reserves using  leguminous thorny plants.

See also 
 List of ecoregions in Rwanda

References

Bibliography
 

 
 

Biota of Rwanda
Rwanda